Ricardo Baca (born  ) is an American journalist best known for being the first full-time marijuana rights editor for a major American newspaper. He was an editor at The Denver Post, producing The Cannabist for over three years until December, 2016. He is the "central character" of the 2015 documentary film Rolling Papers. He also shares his name with the first person to be convicted for the possession of marijuana after the Marijuana Tax Act of 1937 was put into action.

Education
Baca went to high school at Westminster High School in the Denver suburbs, where he wrote for the school paper. He earned a bachelor's degree in journalism in 1999 from Metropolitan State University of Denver.

Work
Prior to The Cannabist, Baca worked at Corpus Christi Caller-Times from 1999 to 2002, and following that, was The Denver Posts music critic and entertainment editor for more than a decade. Baca also co-founded Denver's  Underground Music Showcase in 2002.

In 2016, Baca started Grasslands: A Journalism-Minded Agency, which provides PR, content, and social media marketing for cannabis businesses and others in highly regulated industries, real estate and healthcare.

Personal life
Baca has been married since  2015.

Books

Film
Rolling Papers, 2015, directed by Mitch Dickman

References

Further reading

External links
Writer's page at The Cannabist 

1977 births
Living people
American newspaper editors
Cannabis in Colorado
Cannabis writers
Metropolitan State University of Denver alumni
People from Denver
The Denver Post people